Scala is a producer of multimedia software. It was founded in 1987 as a Norwegian company called Digital Visjon. It is headquartered near Philadelphia, Pennsylvania, USA, and has subsidiaries in Europe and Asia.

History 
In 1987 a young Norwegian entrepreneur, Jon Bøhmer founded the company "Digital Visjon" in Brumunddal, Norway to create multimedia software on the Commodore Amiga computer platform. In 1988 they released their first product which was named InfoChannel 0.97L, which had hotels and cable TV companies as their first customers.

In 1990, they redesigned the program with a new graphical user interface. They renamed the company and the software "Scala" and released a number of multimedia applications. The company attracted investors, mainly from Norway and incorporated in the US in 1994 and is now based in the United States with their European headquarters located in the Netherlands.

The name "Scala" was given by Bøhmer and designer Bjørn Rybakken and represents the scales in colors, tones and the opera in Milan. The name inspired a live actor animation made by Bøhmer and Rybakken using an Amiga, a video camera and a frame-by-frame video digitizer. The animation, named "Lo scalatore" (Italian for 'The Climber'), featured a magic trick of Indian fakirs of a man climbing a ladder and disappearing in the air. This animation was then included into one of the Demo Disks of Scala Multimedia in order to show the capabilities of that presentation software in loading and playing animations whilst also manipulating it with other features of the software.

In 1994 Scala released Multimedia MM400 and InfoChannel 500.

In 1996, due to the bankruptcy of Commodore, Scala left the Amiga platform and started delivering the same applications under MS-DOS. Scala Multimedia MM100, Scala Multimedia Publisher and Scala InfoChannel 100 were released for the x86 platform. Scala MM100 won Byte Magazine's "Best of Comdex" in 1996.

Corporate governance
As of December 2013, the CEO of Scala is Tom Nix, who was formerly a regional vice president. Nix succeeds Gerard Bucas, who retired after nine years.

Scala Multimedia 
The first versions for the Amiga computer were a video titler and slide show authoring system. Scala was bundled with typefaces, background images, and a selection of transition effects to be applied to them. The artwork was designed by Bjørn Rybakken. Scala was also capable of working with Genlock equipment to superimpose titles over footage played through the devices video input.

Succeeding versions of the program on the same platform added features such as animation playback, more effects ("Wipes") and the ability to interact with multimedia devices through a programming language called "Lingua" (Latin for "language").

With its move to Windows, Scala became more complex and gained the ability to support languages such as Python and Visual Basic.

Scala5 
In late 2008, Scala stopped calling their product line InfoChannel and went through a period of referring only to their "solutions". At the start of 2009, the product line was being called 'Scala5' and being referred to as such in all their press releases.

Scala5 has three main components: Scala Designer, an authoring program which is used to create dynamic content, Scala Content Manager, which is used to manage and distribute content, and Scala Player, which plays back the distributed content.

Scala Enterprise 
Scala's latest suite of Digital signage software is referred to as Scala Enterprise. The solution, a software suite consisting of Scala Designer, Scala Player, and Scala Content Manager officially launched in mid- 2013. 
At launch, release version 10.0 featured HTML5 and Android player support, the usage of interactive features on mobile devices to engage with retail and corporate communications audiences, and social media integrations.

As of April 2018, the latest version of Scala Enterprise is version 11.05.

References

External links
 
 Original animation of "LoScalatore" and other Scala demos preserved for historical purposes on randelshofer.ch site
 Scala's Trade Mark 'InfoChannel' (CTM 301275) has been cancelled by the Office for Harmonization in the Internal Market

1987 establishments in Norway
Norwegian companies established in 1987
Companies based in Pennsylvania
Presentation software
Amiga software
Software companies of the United States
Signage